This is a list of star systems within 45-50 light years of Earth.

See also
Lists of stars
 List of star systems within 40-45 light-years
 List of star systems within 50-55 light-years
List of nearest stars and brown dwarfs

References

star systems within 45–50 light-years
Star systems
star systems within 45–50 light-years